Hover flies (family Syrphidae) of the genus Microdon are unusual among the Diptera. Like other members of the subfamily, they are myrmecophiles, meaning they inhabit the nests of ants.

There are 249 species known worldwide, with the greatest diversity being from the tropics; 30 species are known from North America, though it is expected that many of these species will be placed in other genera in time, as Microdon has been used as a catch-all for various unrelated species not placed in other genera.

Appearance
Microdon adults look more or less like typical flies. Like some other hoverflies, they are generally robust and very hairy, often closely resembling bees. They are between 8 and 15 mm long. The antennae are rather long, with the last (third) segment nearly as long as, or sometimes significantly longer than, the first segment; the antennae are nearly as long as the fly's face. These flies are covered in black or pale (white or golden) hairs, and are themselves either black or metallic green or blue. The scutellum is with apical calcars and wing vein R4+5 with an appendix. They have simple legs and abdomens.

The real oddity of the genus Microdon is in its larvae and pupae. These are dome-shaped and look like stout little slugs. Their appearance originally led scientists to describe them as mollusks and scale insects. They are slow-moving.  Most have the spiracles on a peg-like protuberance extending from the end of their abdomens.

Behaviour
Adult Microdon flies do not behave like other syrphid flies; they do not hover around flowers, but instead remain very near the ant colonies which serve as larval hosts.

Larvae may be found very deep in ant colonies. Some species actively feed on ant larvae in the colony, others are speculated to be scavengers. Microdon larvae are more or less restricted in their ant host species. Some Microdon species have only ever been found in the colonies of a single ant species, while others are restricted to related ant species or genera.  Because these flies have such cryptic life cycles, biological information on most species is limited.

Species
Microdon is divided into six subgenera (including Microdon s.s.), plus five species groups and some unplaced species in "Microdon s.l.".

Subgenus Chymophila

Nearctic:

 Microdon fulgens Wiedemann, 1830 (Synonyms: Microdon euglossoides Gray, 1832; Chymophila splendens Macquart, 1834)

Neotropical:

Oriental:

Palaearctic:
 Microdon katsurai Maruyama & Hironaga, 2004

Subgenus Dimeraspis

Microdon abditus Thompson, 1981 
Microdon adventitius Thompson, 1981 
Microdon fuscipennis (Macquart, 1834) 
Microdon globosus (Fabricius, 1805)
Microdon marmoratum Bigot, 1884 
Microdon remotus Knab, 1917

Subgenus Megodon

M. planitarsus Keiser, 1971
M. stuckenbergi (Keiser, 1971)

Subgenus Microdon s.s.

Nearctic:

Neotropical:

Oriental:

Palaearctic:

Subgenus Myiacerapis

Myiacerapis is a subgenus of the hoverfly genus Microdon. It contains only one species, Microdon villosus. It is native to Uganda, though an undescribed species is known from South Africa. Larvae are found in ant nests.

Subgenus Syrphipogon

There are two species described in Syrphipogon:
M. fucatissimus (Hull, 1937)
M. gaigei Steyskal, 1953

Microdon s.l. species groups

craigheadii-group
Nearctic:
 Microdon craigheadii Walton, 1912

erythros-group
Afrotropical:
 Microdon erythros Bezzi, 1908
= Microdon erytherus Bezzi, 1921 (misspelling)
 Microdon luteiventris Bezzi, 1915

mirabilis-group
Neotropical:
 Microdon bertonii Bezzi, 1910
= Microdon arcuata Curran, 1941
 Microdon iheringi Bezzi, 1910
 Microdon mirabilis Williston, 1888

tarsalis-group
Afrotropical:
 Microdon tarsalis Hervé-Bazin, 1913
= Microdon bequaerti Curran, 1929

Unplaced species
Afrotropical

Microdon harinhalai (Reemer, 2015) 
Microdon berobak (Reemer, 2015) 
Microdon ifanadiana (Reemer, 2015) 
Microdon irwini (Reemer, 2015) 
[[*Microdon janne (Reemer, 2015) 
Microdon sava (Reemer, 2015) 
 Microdon tsara Keiser, 1971

Australian / Oceanian:
 Microdon amabilis Ferguson, 1926
 Microdon macquariensis Ferguson, 1926
 Microdon nigromarginalis Curran & Bryan, 1926
 Microdon pictipennis (Macquart, 1850)
= Microdon pictulipennis Hull, 1944
 Microdon rieki Paramonov, 1957
 Microdon waterhousei Ferguson, 1926

Oriental:
 Microdon carbonarius Brunetti, 1923
 Microdon pagdeni Curran, 1942
 Microdon trimacula Curran, 1928
 Microdon unicolor Brunetti, 1915

References

Hoverfly genera
Microdontinae
Myrmecology
Taxa named by Johann Wilhelm Meigen